TAFE Queensland is the statutory authority parent body for TAFE technical and further education training in the Australian state of Queensland.

Established in 1882, TAFE Queensland is one of Australia's largest education providers with 120,000+ students trained each year across the state, nationally and internationally.

On 1 July 2013, the state's TAFE institutes were organised into six regions; Brisbane, East Coast, Gold Coast, North, SkillsTech, and South West.

On 1 July 2014, TAFE Queensland was officially established as a statutory body by the TAFE Queensland Act 2013. 

On 1 July 2017, TAFE Queensland began consolidating their six regional registered training organisations (RTO) into a single RTO.

Regions
TAFE Queensland Brisbane 
TAFE Queensland Gold Coast 
TAFE Queensland Sunshine Coast  
TAFE Queensland Darling Downs and South West  
TAFE Queensland Wide Bay Burnett 
TAFE Queensland Far North Queensland  
TAFE Queensland North Queensland

Education & Training Offerings 
TAFE Queensland offers a wide range of qualifications under the Australian Qualifications Framework, including entry-level skill sets, certificates, diplomas, advanced diplomas and bachelor degrees.
Certificate I
Certificate II
Certificate III 
Certificate IV
Diploma 
Advanced Diploma 
Bachelor's degree

See also

Education in Australia
Registered Training Organisations
TAFE Queensland Brisbane
TAFE Queensland Gold Coast
TAFE Queensland East Coast
TAFE Queensland South West
TAFE Queensland SkillsTech  
TAFE Queensland North

References

Further reading

External links
 TAFE Queensland

 
Education in Queensland
Australian vocational education and training providers